Romain Bayard (born 15 October 1993) is a French professional footballer who plays as a winger for Swiss club Lausanne Ouchy.

Club career
On 27 July 2021, he joined Lausanne Ouchy in Switzerland.

References

Living people
1993 births
People from Compiègne
Sportspeople from Oise
Association football wingers
French footballers
Ligue 2 players
Championnat National players
Championnat National 2 players
Swiss Challenge League players
FC Sochaux-Montbéliard players
ASM Belfort players
USL Dunkerque players
Stade Lavallois players
Tours FC players
Pau FC players
FC Stade Lausanne Ouchy players
French expatriate footballers
Expatriate footballers in Switzerland
French expatriate sportspeople in Switzerland
Footballers from Hauts-de-France